The 1965–66 NBA season was the 76ers 17th season in the NBA and 3rd season in City Philadelphia. The Sixers would capture the regular season division championship by a game over the Boston Celtics. However, in the Eastern Conference Finals, they would lose to the Celtics in five games. After this series, Dolph Schayes was fired as coach and Alex Hannum would take over as the new coach.

Roster

Regular season

x – clinched playoff spot

Record vs. opponents

Game log

Playoffs

|- align="center" bgcolor="#ffcccc"
| 1
| April 3
| Boston
| L 96–115
| Wilt Chamberlain (25)
| Wilt Chamberlain (32)
| Chamberlain, W. Jones (5)
| Municipal Auditorium6,563
| 0–1
|- align="center" bgcolor="#ffcccc"
| 2
| April 6
| @ Boston
| L 93–114
| Wilt Chamberlain (23)
| Wilt Chamberlain (25)
| Billy Cunningham (4)
| Boston Garden13,909
| 0–2
|- align="center" bgcolor="#ccffcc"
| 3
| April 7
| Boston
| W 111–105
| Wilt Chamberlain (31)
| Wilt Chamberlain (27)
| Hal Greer (9)
| Municipal Auditorium10,454
| 1–2
|- align="center" bgcolor="#ffcccc"
| 4
| April 10
| @ Boston
| L 108–114 (OT)
| Hal Greer (25)
| Wilt Chamberlain (33)
| Hal Greer (4)
| Boston Garden13,909
| 1–3
|- align="center" bgcolor="#ffcccc"
| 5
| April 12
| Boston
| L 112–120
| Wilt Chamberlain (46)
| Wilt Chamberlain (34)
| Chet Walker (8)
| Municipal Auditorium8,623
| 1–4
|-

Awards and records
Wilt Chamberlain, NBA Most Valuable Player Award
Dolph Schayes, NBA Coach of the Year Award
Wilt Chamberlain, All-NBA First Team
Hal Greer, All-NBA Second Team
Billy Cunningham, NBA All-Rookie Team (1st)

References

Philadelphia 76ers seasons
Philadelphia
Philadel
Philadel